Viktória FC Szombathely, a.k.a. Viktoria-Trend Optika FC for sponsorship reasons, is a Hungarian women's football club from Szombathely, currently competing in Noi NB I. Founded in 1993, it became one of the leading Hungarian teams in the 2000s, winning two championships in 2004 and 2009, consequently appearing twice in the Champions League. In 2011 it won its third national cup.

Titles
 2 Hungarian Leagues (2004, 2009)
 3 Hungarian Cups (2008, 2009, 2011)

Record in UEFA competitions

Current squad

References

Viktoria Szombathely
Viktoria Szombathely
1993 establishments in Hungary
Sport in Szombathely